The Wicked City is a novel for children by Isaac Bashevis Singer. Originally written in Yiddish it was published in English in 1972. The book is a retelling of the story of Lot and the people of Sodom from the Bible, though Singer omits certain elements of the Bible story.

References

Novels by Isaac Bashevis Singer
American children's novels
1972 American novels
Yiddish-language literature
1972 children's books
Novels based on the Bible